Belgrano III Base was a permanent, all year-round Argentine Antarctic base and scientific research station named after General Manuel Belgrano, one of the Libertadores and the creator of the Argentine Flag. It was located on Berkner Island on the Filchner Ice Shelf.

At the time of its inauguration it was Argentina's southernmost permanent base.
It was shut down in 1984 over safety concerns due to it being built on increasingly unstable ice, which endangered both personnel and equipment.

History
On 8 January 1980, launching the second stage of the 1979–80 austral summer campaign, the Argentine Navy's new icebreaker ARA Almirante Irízar sailed away from Buenos Aires with the mission of founding a new base on Berkner Island, on the Filchner Ice Shelf.

Belgrano III was officially inaugurated on 30 January after finishing unloading of cargo with the aid of two Puma SA 330 helicopters from the Argentine Army Aviation Command. At this time it hosted a nine-men Argentine Army complement.

Belgrano III was shut down after 4 years of continuous service due to the fast deterioration of the ice barrier it was sitting on; new, often hidden cracks and crevices endangered the on-duty personnel and material.
The base was closed on 15 January 1984 and all of its staff was evacuated by a helicopter operating from  Almirante Irízar. Due to a mix of very bad weather and mechanical failure of the second helicopter aboard Almirante Irízar,  of packaged equipment had to be left behind to be recovered by land or, if not possible, in a later summer campaign. 
The salvage of such equipment was further delayed for several campaigns because of unusual pack ice thickness and other transport and logistic setbacks.

Description
The initial facilities at Belgrano III were composed of nine mobile modules coupled together and mounted on continuous tracks. They were constructed of plastic material, which provided structural strength and thermal insulation at the same time, necessary features to withstand the rigorous winds and freezing temperatures prevailing in the area. In addition the base had a cubicle mounted on skis. These facilities were assigned to staff accommodation, communications station, infirmary, meteorological station, kitchen, bathroom and power plant.

A freezing chamber was built in the ice, and some deposits were installed directly on the ground.

Scientific activities
Besides the usual equipment and facility maintenance duties, personnel at Belgrano III carried out various scientific projects regarding meteorology, geomagnetism and topographic surveys on the area.

See also
 Argentine Antarctica
 List of Antarctic research stations
 List of Antarctic field camps

References

External links
 Fundaciòn Marambio – Base Belgrano III 
 Dirección Nacional del Antártico

Belgrano III
Populated places established in 1980
Berkner Island
1980 establishments in Antarctica